Milija Marković (1812-1877) was a Serbian painter and priest (1832—1842), father of academic painter Nikola Marković. In his early youth, he worked as a teacher in the Rukumija, Zaova and Gornjak monasteries. The Serbian Metropolitan Melentije Pavlović invited him to train at his court, where he socialized with princes Mihailo Obrenović and Milan Obrenović. He perfected his painting craft at the Academy of Fine Arts Vienna. Milija Marković collaborated on commission with painter Dimitrije Posniaković (1814-1891).

Works 
Marković's most famous works include:

 Kiseljačka church
 Church of the Bukovo monastery, 1837
 City church in Ćuprija, 1837
 Smoljinac church, 1847
 Užice church, 1850
 City church in Loznica
 Church of the monastery Vitovnica, 1856
 Church in Rača, Kragujevacka, 1859
 Rukumija monastery church

See more 
 List of Serbian painters

References 

19th-century Serbian painters
Serbian clergy

1812 births
1877 deaths
Academy of Fine Arts Vienna alumni